Zolfo Springs is a town in Hardee County, Florida, United States. The population was 1,827 at the 2010 census, up from 1,641 at the 2000 census.

History
Early prosperity in the area (known initially as simply Zolfo) was due to its location along the Florida Cracker Trail, a cattle trail from Bradenton to Fort Pierce.  Cattle herded from this area and the Florida Heartland was run to the coasts along this route as early as 1850.  The Florida Cracker Trail today includes parts of State Road 64 and State Road 66 through Zolfo Springs.

In 1886, transportation improved through Zolfo when the Florida Southern Railway (later the Atlantic Coast Line Railroad) was built through the town on its way from Bartow to Punta Gorda.  The railroad built a depot in the town and a post office was established the same year.  The railroad was removed in the early 1980s.  Today US 17 runs along the former railroad right of way (with Main Street being the original alignment of US 17).

The town incorporated into the city of Zolfo Springs on September 13, 1904.

Geography

Zolfo Springs is located at the geographic center of Hardee County, at  (27.496211, –81.796878). U.S. Route 17 runs through the center of town, leading north  to Wauchula, the county seat, and south  to Arcadia. Florida State Road 64 crosses the northern side of town, leading northeast  to Avon Park and west  to Bradenton. SR 66 leaves US 17 at the center of Zolfo Springs and leads east  to U.S. Route 27 at the south end of Sebring.

The Peace River, which flows south to Punta Gorda, forms part of the northern town boundary. Pioneer Park Lake and Pioneer Park are also inside the town's boundaries.

Demographics

As of the census of 2017, there were 1,816. In 2000 there were 1,641 people, 497 households, and 399 families residing in the town. The racial makeup of the town was 65.69% White, 3.35% African American, 0.18% Native American, 0.12% Asian, 0.12% Pacific Islander, 29.07% from other races, and 1.46% from two or more races. Hispanic or Latino of any race were 53.63% of the population.

There were 497 households, out of which 39.4% had children under the age of 18 living with them, 60.2% were married couples living together, 15.1% had a female householder with no husband present, and 19.7% were non-families. 14.9% of all households were made up of individuals, and 9.5% had someone living alone who was 65 years of age or older.  The average household size was 3.26 and the average family size was 3.55.

In the town, the population was spread out, with 32.3% under the age of 18, 11.2% from 18 to 24, 25.3% from 25 to 44, 16.4% from 45 to 64, and 14.9% who were 65 years of age or older.  The median age was 30 years. For every 100 females, there were 102.3 males.  For every 100 females age 18 and over, there were 100.2 males.

The median income for a household in the town was $25,972, and the median income for a family was $27,188. Males had a median income of $18,603 versus $17,292 for females. The per capita income for the town was $11,397.  About 18.7% of families and 27.3% of the population were below the poverty line, including 33.2% of those under age 18 and 18.9% of those age 65 or over.

Media
  WZZS-FM (106.9 The Bull)
 WZSP-FM (105.3 La Zeta)

References

External links 
 Town of Zolfo Springs official website
 Pioneer Park Days

Towns in Hardee County, Florida
Towns in Florida